Walter A. Dods Jr. is an American business executive, banker and philanthropist. He is past Chairman of Hawaiian Telcom and Alexander & Baldwin as well as past President of the American Bankers Association. He serves as the Chairman of Matson, Inc.

Biography

Early life
Walter A. Dods Jr. was educated at the St. Louis High School in Honolulu. He graduated from the University of Hawaii, where he received a Bachelor of Business Administration.

Career
He served as Chief Executive Officer, President and Chairman of BancWest, a subsidiary of BNP Paribas. He then served as Chairman of the First Hawaiian Bank, a subsidiary of BancWest. He served as Chairman of Hawaiian Telcom and Alexander & Baldwin.

He served on the boards of directors of the First Insurance Company of Hawaii, the Grace Pacific Corporation, the Maui Land & Pineapple Company, Mid Pac Petroleum, the Pacific Guardian Life Insurance Co., and Servco Pacific.

He is past president of the American Bankers Association. He also served on the Federal Advisory Council of the United States Federal Reserve System, representing the 12th district of the Federal Reserve from 1999 to 2000. He is a Trustee of the Estate of Samuel Mills Damon.

He has served as the Chairman of the Board of Matson since June 2012.

Philanthropy
He serves on the board of trustees of the Honolulu Museum of Art and the Japan-America Institute of Management Science (JAIMS). Additionally, he sits on the board of governors of the Chaminade University of Honolulu, and on the board of advisors for Catholic Charities Hawaii and the University of Hawaii School of Social Work.

References

American bankers
American Bankers Association
American business executives
American philanthropists
Living people
University of Hawaiʻi alumni
Year of birth missing (living people)